Tsarvaritsa or Tsurvaritsa is a village in the municipality of Nevestino, located in the Kyustendil Province of western Bulgaria. As of 2007, the village had a population of 84 people.

Notable people
Zlatan Stoykov (born 1951), military figure

References

Villages in Kyustendil Province